Kieron Thomas Evans (born 19 December 2001) is a Welsh professional footballer who plays as a midfielder for Torquay United on loan from EFL Championship side Cardiff City.

Club career
Evans began his career as a youth player at Cardiff City joining the academy at under 10s level. In the 2019–20 season Evans was the top scorer for Cardiff's under 18s which brought him to the attention of first team manager Neil Harris. Subsequently, he was selected in the first team squad for a EFL Cup first round match against Northampton Town but was an unused substitute.  He was selected for his first league squad in December 2020 but was again an unused substitute. Evans made his first team debut on 12 September 2021 as an 87th minute substitute for fellow Cardiff City academy graduate Mark Harris in a 2–1 victory over Nottingham Forest. On 31 January 2022 Evans joined Linfield on loan for the remainder of the 2021–22 season. On 30 June 2022 Evans joined Torquay United on loan for the 2022-23 season.

Career statistics

References 

2001 births
Living people
People from New Tredegar
Sportspeople from Caerphilly County Borough
Welsh footballers
Wales youth international footballers
Wales under-21 international footballers
Association football midfielders
Cardiff City F.C. players
Linfield F.C. players
Torquay United F.C. players
English Football League players
NIFL Premiership players
National League (English football) players